Hussain Sagar Thermal Power Station was a historic thermal power plant that was located in Hyderabad, Telangana on the banks of Hussain Sagar. It was India's first thermal power station, opened in 1920 by the erstwhile seventh Nizam of Hyderabad.

History
Hussain Sagar Thermal Power Station was built in 1920 during the time of Seventh Nizam, Mir Osman Ali Khan.

Plant
The power plant was built in 1920 at Mint Compound, and was operated by Hyderabad State Electricity Department of the erstwhile Kingdom of Hyderabad to supply power to the twin cities of Hyderabad and Secunderabad Equipment was procured from English Electric and Westinghouse Electric. The power plant comprised four units. The generation was 22.5 MW on a consumption of about 200 tons of coal per day. The plant was fully operational until 1972 when two units were shut down. In 1984, for practical reasons production mostly ended. However, until 1992 the plant was intermittently used. The structure was demolished in 1995.

Location
Hussain Sagar Thermal Power Station occupied the banks of Hussain Sagar, Hyderabad – where Prasad's IMAX and NTR gardens exist today.

See also

:Category:Establishments in Hyderabad State

References

Coal-fired power stations in Telangana
Economy of Hyderabad, India
Hyderabad State
1920 establishments in British India
1983 disestablishments in India
British colonial architecture in India
Establishments in Hyderabad State